Michael Campbell (born August 12, 1989) is a former  American gridiron football wide receiver. He was signed by the New York Jets as an undrafted free agent in 2011. He played college football at Temple University.

Early years
Born and raised in Edison, New Jersey, Campbell attended Edison High School. He was named to the Newark Star Ledger first-team All-Middlesex and first-team All-Greater Middlesex Conference team. He recorded 39 receptions for 745 receiving yards and along with 14 Touchdowns in his senior season in high school. He was named MVP of the 2007 New York/New Jersey All-Star Classic. He was selected to participate in the 2007 New Jersey North-South All-Star Game. He selected as a member of the NJFCA Super 100 Team.

College career
Campbell was selected to the 2010 All-MAC third-team by Phil Steele. He was named the Temple's 2010 Offensive MVP following his senior season. He was an Honorable Mention National Performer of the Week (November 21, 2010)

Professional career

New York Jets
On July 27, 2011, he signed with the New York Jets as an undrafted free agent. On September 2, 2011, he was released. On September 27, 2011, he was signed to the practice squad. On October 4, 2011, he was released from the practice squad. On October 12, 2011, he was signed to the practice squad again. On October 25, 2011, he was released from the practice squad. On November 1, 2011, he was signed to the practice squad after wide receiver Scotty McKnight was placed on practice-squad injured reserve due to a torn ACL. On January 2, 2012, he was signed to a reserve/future contract. On March 14, 2012, he was released.

St. Louis Rams
On May 14, 2012, he signed with the St. Louis Rams.  On August 28, he was released.

Second Stint with New York Jets
Campbell signed with the New York Jets on August 4, 2013. He was released on August 31 but was signed to the practice squad a day later. He was promoted to the active roster on October 5, 2013. He was released on November 1, 2013. He was re-signed to the practice squad on November 27, 2013. He was released on August 24, 2014.

References

External links
Temple bio
New York Jets bio

Living people
People from Edison, New Jersey
Players of American football from New Jersey
Sportspeople from Middlesex County, New Jersey
American football wide receivers
Temple Owls football players
New York Jets players
St. Louis Rams players
1989 births
Ottawa Redblacks players
Saskatchewan Roughriders players
Edison High School (New Jersey) alumni